Helenoscoparia nigritalis is a moth in the family Crambidae. It was described by Francis Walker in 1875. It is found on Saint Helena.

References

Moths described in 1875
Scopariinae